Youlan may refer to:
 Youlan is a Chinese name, usually used for females. Youlan may refer to:
 Youlan (noble) (幼蘭), mother of China's last emperor Puyi and princess consort of Zaifeng, Prince Chun
 Jieshi Diao Youlan (碣石調幽蘭), ancient guqin melody
 Youlan (town) (幽兰镇), Nanchang County, Jiangxi